Omar Alvarado García (born July 17, 1974) better known by his ring name Stuka Jr. is a Mexican second-generation luchador enmascarado, or masked professional wrestler, who works for the Mexican professional wrestling promotion Consejo Mundial de Lucha Libre (CMLL). Stuka Jr. is not, despite what the name indicates, the son of luchador Stuka but is Stuka's younger brother. On September 16, 2022, Stuka Jr. lost a Lucha de Apuestas match to Atlantis Jr., after which he was forced to unmask and reveal his birth name. His mask was styled to look like aviator goggles and an early 20th-century pilot helmet and his tights include designs representing the Luftwaffe's Balkenkreuz insignia, reflecting the Stuka dive bomber from which his name is taken.

For years Stuka Jr. formed a team with Fuego, known as Los Bombadieros ("The Bombardiers"), who collectively he held the CMLL Arena Coliseo Tag Team Championship for a record four and a half years.  He is the reigning NWA World Historic Light Heavyweight Champion, having won it on August 12, 2018. He is also a former holder of the Mexican National Trios Championship, with Metro and Máscara Dorada, a former Occidente Light Heavyweight Champion and the winner of the 2014 Reyes del Aire ("King of the air") tournament. Some sources list a "Stuka Jr." wrestling in the 1990s, which is believed to be a wrestler generally known as "Stuka II", who occasionally was billed as "Stuka Jr."

Personal life
Stuka Jr. was born on July 17, 1974, in the Lagunero town of Gómez Palacio, Durango in Mexico. His father was a professional wrestler known under the ring name Oso García (Bear García). His 15-year older brother Joel García had already made his professional wrestling debut by the time Stuka Jr. was born, using the name "Stuka". His other brothers followed in his footsteps, working under the ring names "Oso Negro" ("Black Bear") and Dandy García.

Professional wrestling career
Stuka Jr. made his professional wrestling debut in 2002, after training with his older brother Stuka as well as local trainer El Moro. He adopted the ring name Stuka Jr., inspired by his brother, adopting a ring outfit adorned with the German Luftwaffe's Balkenkreuz insignia and a mask fashioned to look like aviator goggles and a helmet, avoiding the use of Nazi insignias on his ring gear. His first confirmed match was on February 27, 2002, where he teamed with Gigolo and La Parka to defeat El Texano, Jerry Estrada and Máscara Maligna (Stuka under a different mask). Initially, the Stuka brothers teamed together, winning the Northern Mexico Tag Team Championship not long after Stuka Jr. made his wrestling debut.

Consejo Mundial de Lucha Libre (2005–present)
In early 2005, Stuka Jr. made his debut for Consejo Mundial de Lucha Libre (CMLL), teaming with Chamaco Valaguez Jr. and Sensei to defeat Pandilla Guerrera (Arkangel de la Muerte, El Koreano and Hooligan). Because of CMLL's working relationship with International Wrestling Revolution Group (IWRG), Stuka Jr. participated in several of IWRG's major events including participating in IWRG's 2005 Guerra del Golfo event. At Guerra del Golfo Stuka Jr., El Felino, Mephisto and Pierroth escaped the steel cage match, forcing Ultra Mega to compete, and lose his mask to Nemesis later that night. In CMLL he was mainly working in the opening matches while receiving additional training from its head trainer Satánico. Stuka Jr.'s first headline exposure came when he participated in the first Torneo cibernetico qualifier for the 2007 Leyenda de Plata tournament on May 18, 2007, where he was eliminated by eventual winner Mr. Águila. A month later Stuka Jr. participated in the 2007 version of CMLL's Torneo Gran Alternativa, teaming up with v Feteran Negro Casas. The team lost to Dr. Wagner Jr. and Máscara Purpura in the first round. On September 28, 2007, Stuka Jr. teamed up with Metalico and Valiente to defeat Los Infernales (Euforia and Nosferatu) and Loco Max on the undercard of the CMLL 75th Anniversary Show.

Los Bombadieros (2008–2013)
By 2008 Stuka Jr. had begun teaming with Flash on a semi-regular basis, especially on CMLL's "lower level" shows away from Arena Mexico. When CMLL announced that they were bringing back the CMLL Arena Coliseo Tag Team Championship in June 2008, the team of Stuka Jr. and Flash was one of the 16 teams entered in the tournament. The tournament's first three-round took place on June 22, 2008, and saw Stuka Jr. and Flash defeat Astro Boy and Molotov in the first round, the Los Guerreros Tuareg team of Nitro and Skandalo in the quarter-final and Bronco and Diamante Negro in the semi-final. The team faced and defeated Los Infernales (Nosferatu and Euforia) in the final on June 28 to win the Arena Coliseo Tag Team Championship. Stuka Jr. and Flash teamed with Máscara Purpura to defeat the Guerreros Tuareg team of Arkangel de la Muerte, Loco Max, and Skándalo at CMLL's 2008 Infierno en el Ring event. Throughout late 2008 Stuka Jr. and Flash worked a series of matches against Los Infernales, including a successful tag team title defense on December 14, 2008. Los Infernales defeated Stuka Jr. and Flash at CMLL's La Hora Cero PPV on January 11, 2009, but the Coliseo Tag Team title was not  The tournament's first three-round took place on June 22, 2008. In June 2009, Stuka Jr. along with El Hijo del Fantasma, Sangre Azteca and Dragón Rojo Jr. traveled to Europe to wrestle at the Hot Air Fair, an art exhibit featuring a wrestling show for the fair-goers. Stuka Jr. and Flash teamed with Metalico at CMLL's 2009 Infierno en el Ring event as the trio lost to the team of Virus, Euforia, and Skandalo.

On December 19, 2009, the Comisión de Box y Lucha Libre Mexico D.F. announced that Poder Mexica had been stripped of the Mexican National Trios Championship because Black Warrior had left CMLL, breaking up the team. At the same time, they announced an eight-team tournament to crown new trios champions. The top half of the bracket took place on December 22, 2009, and the bottom half of the bracket occurred on December 29. In the top bracket, Stuka Jr. teamed with Máscara Dorada and Metro for the first time ever and defeated Guerreros Tuareg (Arkangel de la Muerte, Loco Max, and Skándalo) in the first round and Los Cancerberos del Infierno (Virus, Euforia, and Pólvora) in the second round to qualify for the finals. The bottom bracket took place on December 29, 2009, and saw the team of Poder Mexica (Sangre Azteca, Dragón Rojo Jr., and Misterioso Jr.) qualify for the final. On January 6, 2010, Mascara Dorada, Stuka Jr., and Metro defeated Poder Mexica to become the new Mexican National Trios Champions, making Stuka Jr. a double champion. In mid-2010 Stuka Jr. and Metal Blanco started a storyline feud against Máscara Mágica and Exterminador, that played out on CMLL's weekly shows in Guadalajara, Jalisco. On July 27, Stuka Jr. and Metal Blanco won a Lucha de Apuesta, masks vs. hair match. Stuka Jr. and Metal Blanco originally appeared like they would have to unmask after losing the third fall, but the local wrestling commission voided the results of the third fall due to cheating by Máscara Mágica and Extreminador, restarting the match. In the end, Stuka Jr. and Metal Blanco won the third and deciding fall, forcing their opponents to be shaved bald per lucha libre traditions.

By virtue of holding the Mexican National Trios Championship Stuka Jr. participated in the 2010 Universal Championship tournament. Stuka Jr. was part of "Block A" that competed on the July 30, 2010, Super Viernes show. He was the second wrestler eliminated in the seeding battle royal and then lost to his Mexican National Trios Championship partner Mascara Dorada in the first round of the actual tournament. On November 18, Máscara Dorada announced he was relinquishing the Mexican National Trios Championship. Stuka Jr.'s and Metro's new partner was to be determined in an online poll. On December 20, CMLL announced that Delta had won the poll and became one-third of the champions, alongside Stuka Jr. and Metro. On January 9, 2011, Stuka Jr., Delta, and Metro lost the Mexican National Trios Championship to Ángel de Oro, Diamante, and Rush. He was briefly unmasked by Euforia on Spanish TV in late March 2011, but his face was blurred out on television. In late 2012 Stuka Jr. began to develop a rivalry with Japanese wrestler Namajague, initiated by Namajague's attempts to cheat his way to victory. Stuka Jr. and Fuego successfully defended the CMLL Arena Coliseo Tag Team Championship against Namajague and his La Fiebre Amarilla ("The Yellow Fever") partner Okumura. Through the series of Arena Coliseo tag team matches Namajague began targeting Stuka Jr. specifically, more intent on hurting and humiliating him including tearing Stuka Jr.'s mask open during the match. In late 2013 Rey Cometa was added to the storyline as it also drew in Okumura as Namajague's back up. On March 3, 2013, Stuka Jr. and Fuego's four and a half year reign as the CMLL Arena Coliseo Tag Team Champions came to an end, when they lost the title to Namajague and Okumura. On March 15, 2013, Stuka Jr. and Rey Cometa defeated La Fiebre Amarilla in the main event of the 2013 Homenaje a Dos Leyendas show, forcing Okumura to have all his hair shaved off and Namajague was unmasked and had to reveal his real name, Kyosuke Mikami, as per lucha libre traditions.

Various teams (2013–2016)
In late March 2013 Stuka Jr. was announced as a participant in the 2013 En Busca de un Ídolo ("In search of an Idol") tournament that took place from May to July 2013 as one of eight competitors. From January 14 to 19, 2014, Stuka Jr. worked the New Japan Pro-Wrestling (NJPW) and CMLL co-produced Fantastica Mania 2014 tour, which marked his debut in Japan. For the entire tour, Stuka Jr. worked undercard matches alongside Rey Cometa. On April 27, Stuka Jr. won the 2014 Reyes del Aire tournament, outlasting a field that included Averno, Mephisto, Ephesto, Mr. Niebla, Valiente, Tritón, Delta, Guerrero Maya Jr., Rey Cometa, Niebla Roja, Puma, and Tiger. In January 2015, Stuka Jr. returned to Japan to take part in the Fantastica Mania 2015 tour, during which he unsuccessfully challenged Mephisto for the Mexican National Light Heavyweight Championship. Stuka Jr. would go on to unsuccessfully challenge Mephisto for a championship on two further occasions, on July 5, 2015, and August 7, 2017. Stuka Jr. and various partners would also unsuccessfully challenge Mephisto, Ephesto, and Luciferno for the Mexican National Trios Championship on four occasions between 2015 and 2016.

Singles championship pursuit (2017–present)
For the 2017 Torneo Nacional de Parejas Increíbles tournament Stuka Jr. was teamed up with Hechicero as part of their slowly developing storyline rivalry. The duo lost to Rush and El Terrible in the first round. A month later Hechicero successfully defended the NWA World Historic Light Heavyweight Championship against Stuka Jr. The long-running rivalry between Stuka Jr. and Hechicero took another turn as Stuka Jr. defeated Hechicero to win the  NWA World Historic Light Heavyweight Championship on August 14, 2018.

US work (2016–present)
Through CMLL's working relationship Stuka Jr. has worked for the US-based Ring of Honor (ROH) on several occasions over the years. He made his ROH debut on July 16, 2016, losing to Kamaitachi (who had worked for CMLL before joining ROH). Stuka Jr. returned to ROH in June 2018, during the company's tour of Texas. On the first night Stuka Jr., Atlantis and, Guerrero Maya Jr. defeated  SoCal Uncensored (Christopher Daniels, Frankie Kazarian, and Scorpio Sky). The victory led to a match for the ROH World Six-Man Tag Team Championship, losing to then-champions The Kingdom (Matt Taven, T. K. O'Ryan and Vinny Marseglia). Stuka Jr. was invited back for ROH's 2018 Survival of the Fittest tournament on November 4, where he lost to its winner Marty Scurll in the opening round. Stuka Jr. and Guerrero Maya Jr. represented CMLL at the 2019 Crockett Cup tournament on April 27, 2019 in Concord, North Carolina. The duo lost to Royce Isaacs and Thomas Latimer in the first round of the tournament to be eliminated.

Professional wrestling style and persona
Stuka Jr. is credited with inventing the "Torpedo Plancha" dive. For this move Stuka Jr. climbs to the top rope, facing the ring, then he leaps backward in a twisting motion over the top ring post, landing on an opponent on the floor. Another high flying move that Stuka Jr. often uses during tag or trios matches involves one of his tag team partners performing a monkey flip off the entrance ramp, throwing Stuka Jr. high up in the air and onto an opponent on the floor. He often wins his matches with the "Torpedo Splash", a leaping splash off the top rope where Stuka Jr. keeps both arms straight down the side to simulate a bomb dropping from the sky. His wrestling style has earned him the nickname "the Human Missile".

Throughout his career, Stuka Jr. has always portrayed a tecnico (a face in English wrestling terms; those that portray the good guy in wrestling), with the crowds generally behind him, especially for headline matches such as the Lucha de Apuetas win over Okumura and Namajague. Pro Wrestling Illustrated (PWI) as 380 out of the top 500 in 2016, Stuka Jr.'s highest ranking in their annual list. Over the years Stuka Jr. has moved up the ranks of CMLL, initially holding the lowest ranking championship (CMLL Arena Mexico Tag Team Championship), to claiming one of the mid-card titles (the Mexican National Trio Championship), and in 2018 winning one of the top-ranked singles championships in CMLL, the NWA World Historic Light Heavyweight Championship.

Championships and accomplishments
Consejo Mundial de Lucha Libre
CMLL Arena Coliseo Tag Team Championship (1 time) – with Fuego
Mexican National Trios Championship (1 time) – with Metro and Máscara Dorada/Delta
NWA World Historic Light Heavyweight Championship (1 time)
Occidente Light Heavyweight Championship (1 time)
Reyes del Aire (2014)
 Reyes del Aire VIP (2022)
 Rey del Inframundo (2022)
Pro Wrestling Illustrated
PWI ranked him #380 of the top 500 singles wrestlers in the PWI 500 in 2016
Regional Championships
Durango Trios Championship (1 time) – with Bala de Plata and Piloto Suicida
Northern Mexico Lightweight Championship (1 time)
Northern Mexico Tag Team Championship (1 time) – with Stuka
Nuevo León Mexico Trios Championship (1 time) – Tigre Universitario and Gato Volador

Luchas de Apuestas record

Notes

References

1979 births
Mexican male professional wrestlers
Living people
Masked wrestlers
Unidentified wrestlers
Professional wrestlers from Durango
People from Gómez Palacio, Durango
21st-century professional wrestlers
Mexican National Trios Champions
NWA World Historic Light Heavyweight Champions